The Holmegaard bows are a series of self bows found in the bogs of Northern Europe dating from the Mesolithic period.  They are named after the Holmegaard area of Denmark in which the first and oldest specimens were found, and are the oldest bows discovered anywhere in the world.

Description

The shape of the Holmegaard bows is their distinctive feature, having wide, parallel limbs and a biconvex midsection with the tips ending in a point.  The handle is deep, narrow and remains stiff while the bow is drawn.  The bows are generally between 170 and 180 cm in length and less than 6 cm wide.  It has been suggested that only the inner limbs  of a Holmegaard style bow bend in use, but this is incorrect, they bend to their tips.

All Mesolithic bows from this area are made of elm, the best European bow wood apart from yew. (Yew spread to modern Denmark only in about the third millennium BCE.)

Use

Initially, the Holmegaard bows were believed to have been made "backwards", that is with wood removed from the back and the belly made convex.  This may be the result of a comparison with the English longbow that has a flat back and a convex belly. Many successful replicas were made in this fashion even though working the back of the bow cuts the wood fibres and endangers the bow.

Subsequent analysis suggested the back may have instead been convex with the flattened surface being the belly. This is far more efficient for woods like elm which are relatively strong in tension. The compression strain on the belly is evenly distributed on the flat surface which reduces string follow.  Later yew bows are generally narrower, yew being better suited for narrow bows than elm.

Efficiency

The Holmegaard design, under the previous interpretation of a bow that bends only in the broad inner part of the limbs, may be able to shoot an arrow faster and farther due to the light, long and stiff outer limbs that act as levers when propelling the arrow. This is the same principle that explains why a dart can be propelled faster from an Atlatl than from throwing alone.

Such "Holmegaard style" bows are used in flight archery competitions.  For flight bows, an optimum between the length of the stiff tips and the draw force of the bow is desired. If the outer limbs are too long, their weight exceeds the capacity of the energy stored in inner limbs.  The outer limbs can also become unstable if made too thin. In modern Holmegaard-style bows, the outer limbs are much thicker than the inner limbs to prevent the outer limbs from bending excessively.

The original specimens were not finished for such high performance.  There is even doubt as to whether the biconvex shape of the mid-limbs is due to poor preservation in the bogs.  The more recent Holmegaards do not have well defined "shoulders" at all and have more semblance to the American flatbow.

Because of the wide working limbs, Holmegaard bows can be made from more common, lower density woods such as maple, ash, and oak, as well as elm.

References

External links
 The Holmegaard bow at the Nationalmuseet

Bows (archery)
European archaeology
Archaeological discoveries in Denmark